Apostoli, the Italian term for Apostles, may refer to:

Santi Apostoli, Florence, church 
Santi Apostoli, Rome 6th-century basilica in Rome
Fred Apostoli, (1913–1973), boxer known as The Boxing Bell Hop